Franz Karl Delavilla (6 December 1884 – 2 August 1967) was an Austrian-German graphic artist, illustrator, designer and art professor.

Education
In 1903, he won the 1st prize for the best work in drawing at the competition of the 'Niederösterreichischer Gewerbeverein'.

From 1903 to 1908, he was a state scholarship holder at the University of Applied Arts Vienna of the K.K. Austrian Museum of Art and Industry, where he was taught by Carl Otto Czeschka and Bertold Löffler, among others. From 1907, he got first commissions for applied arts and from the same year he worked at the "Wiener Werkstätte", a production association of visual artists, which existed from 1904 until 1932. Designs for jewellery, fashion, stage designs, posters, cards for various occasions and the illustration of books were his metier. From 1908, the workshop held an annual art show, where Delavilla's works were also shown.

Teaching activity until 1944 

In 1914, he was awarded the "Goldenen Preis" of the International Exhibition for Book Trade and Graphics in Leipzig and in the same year he participated in the Werkbund Exhibition in Cologne.

From 1917 until 1933, Delavilla worked as a part-time scenic designer in Frankfurt and Darmstadt. In 1919, he was also a member of the Dresden Secession. In 1922, he became a teacher at the Städelschule in Frankfurt and led the lithography class. In 1923, he was appointed professor. In 1936, he and his colleagues Hugo Bäppler and Albert Windisch accepted a commission from the Ministry of the Reichswehr and designed with a class common rooms of the newly built Olympisches Dorf in Berlin. For this design with Merkbilder of the German landscape, he and his group received an Olympic Medal from Adolf Hitler.

In 1943, he took part in the exhibition  in Vienna, organised by Reichsleiter Baldur von Schirach and thus came under the criticism of conservative Nazi circles. In 1944, he was released into early retirement.

Post-war activity 
During World War II, Delavilla's Frankfurt studio with many of his works burned down. Awards which he had received during the Nazi era prevented his application for Wiedergutmachung after the war. In 1946, he was reinstated as professor at the Städelschule and retired for good in 1950. In 1955, he was awarded the Federal Cross of Merit. Delavilla died in Frankfurt at the age of 82. His grave is located on the Frankfurt Main Cemetery.

In 2004, the Kronberg Gallery exhibited some of his works.

Publications 
 Arthur Roessler: Der Dialog vom Pierrot und andere Essays, Vienna: Karl Graeser [1907] (Umschlag/Titelbild von Delavilla)
 Des Freiherrn von Münchhausen Abenteuer und Reisen; newly edited by Alois Th. Schlagbrandtner. Buchschmuck von Franz K. Delavilla, Vienna: Graeser & Kie., ca. 1910
 Unser Hamburg. Ed. by the Journalists' and Writers' Association for Hamburg, Altona and the surrounding area. With book decoration by F. K. Delavilla, Hamburg 1911, 116 p. (auch weitere Auflagen)
 Kriegsbilderbogen Deutscher Künstler, Mappe III, Munich: Goltz-Verlag 1915
 Gottfried Gurcke: Hamburger Fibel bearbeitet von W.Böhling, J.Spiering und A.Winckler. Pictures byF. K. Delavilla. Schreibschrift von Chr.Seemann, 244. neubearbeitete Auflage, Hamburg: Otto Meißner, 1917
 Deutsche Bühne. Jahrbuch der Frankfurter Städtischen Bühnen. Edited by Georg J. Plotke on behalf of the Generalintendanz . Vol. 1: Spielzeit 1917/1918. Mit 6 (1 farb.) Taf. (m. Bühnenbild-Entwürfen v. Delavilla u. a.) u. 7 Abb. im Text, Frankfurt: Rütten & Loening 1919, 4 vol., 402 p.
 Clara Berg: Schnurli-Butzli und andere deutsche Märchen mit Bildern K. F. Delavilla, Frankfurt: Englert und Schlosser, 20.–30. Tausend, ca. 1925, 123 p.
 : Bundschuh flieg! Ein Zeitbild vom großen Bauernaufstand im Jahre 1525. With pictures by F. K. Delavilla, Stuttgart: Loewe 1936, 3rd edition 1942

Further reading 
 Jung-Wien. Ergebnisse aus der Wiener-Kunstgewerbe-Schule. Entwürfe zu Architekturen und Flächen-Dekorationen junger Wiener Künstler. Architekturen und Modelle, Gartenanlagen, Innen-Räume, Möbel, Plastiken, ferner Plakate, Malereien, Keramiken, Studien und dekorative Holzschnitte, ornamentale Schriften, Vorsatzpapiere und Tapeten, Webereien und Stickereien. Darmstadt: A. Koch 1905, 71 p.
 Die Kunst. Monatshefte für freie und angewandte Kunst, vol. 40: Angewandte Kunst der "Dekorativen Kunst", Jg. 22., Munich: F. Bruckmann 1919 (with a contribution about the stage design and equipment of Delavilla).
 Oskar Fischel: Das moderne Bühnenbild, Berlin: Wasmuth (1923), 142 p.
 Delavilla, Franz K. In Hans Vollmer (ed.): Allgemeines Lexikon der bildenden Künstler des XX. Jahrhunderts. Vol. 1: A–D. E. A. Seemann, Leipzig 1953, p. 537.
 Jugendstilpostkarten. Ed. and with an epilogue by H. Dichand. With a biographical appendix of the performing artists by M. Martischnig. Gütersloh: Buchgemeinschaft (ca. 1980), 174 p. (with plans by Delavilla)
 Franz Karl Delavilla: Bühnenbildentwürfe zur Uraufführung des "Urfaust", Frankfurt 1918, in Hofmannsthal-Blätter, issue 30, Autumn 1984, pp. 60 f.
 Werner J. Schweiger: Bilderbogen der Wiener Werkstätte, Vienna: Ed. Brandstätter 1986.
 Werner J. Schweiger, Die Wiener Werkstätte. Kunst und Handwerk 1903–32, 1982.
 Constanze Neuendorf-Müller: Franz Carl Delavilla (1884–1967), Maler, Graphiker, Kunstgewerbler und Bühnenbildner, Diss. Frankfurt, 1998.

References

External links 
 

Austrian illustrators
German illustrators
Wiener Werkstätte
Officers Crosses of the Order of Merit of the Federal Republic of Germany
1884 births
1967 deaths
Artists from Vienna
Austro-Hungarian emigrants to Germany